Pain Management is the fourth album by the American rapper Bubba Sparxxx. It was released on October 15, 2013, by Average Joes Entertainment and Backroad Records. It was his first album in seven years and has guest appearances by Colt Ford, Rodney Atkins, Danny Boone, Dan Rockett, Crucifix, Dirt Reynolds, Daniel Lee and The Lacs.

Track listing

Chart performance

References

2013 albums
Bubba Sparxxx albums
Average Joes Entertainment albums